Vandit Jivrajani (born 3 September 1991) is an Indian cricketer who plays for Saurashtra. He made his first-class debut on 23 November 2015 in the 2015–16 Ranji Trophy. He made his Twenty20 debut on 9 November 2019, for Saurashtra in the 2019–20 Syed Mushtaq Ali Trophy.

References

External links
 

1991 births
Living people
Indian cricketers
Saurashtra cricketers
People from Rajkot